The 1999 Florida State Seminoles football team represented Florida State University during the college football season of 1999. Winning the Atlantic Coast Conference (ACC) Championship and winning the 2000 Sugar Bowl BCS National Championship game, the team was coached by Bobby Bowden and played their home games at Doak Campbell Stadium. The team entered the season with high expectations after losing to Tennessee in the inaugural BCS Championship game. FSU entered the 1999 pre-season ranked No. 1 in all national pre-season polls, picked unanimously to win the ACC and expected to contend for a national championship. The Seminoles finished 11–2 in 1998, extending their NCAA record to 13 straight seasons with at least 10 victories and ranked among the nation's top four teams.

The Seminoles finished the 1999 season with a perfect 12–0 record and was the first in NCAA history to go "wire-to-wire" being ranked continuously as the nation's No. 1 team from the preseason through the bowl season. This marked the 13th consecutive season that the Seminoles will have finished in the Top 5 rankings of both the AP and coaches poll. The 2000 Sugar Bowl BCS National Championship game also marks the 17th consecutive season the Bowden lead Seminoles played in a bowl game.

Before the season

Preseason outlook

The Seminoles ended the 1998 season with a defeat in the inaugural BCS Championship game to Tennessee and finished with a No. 3 ranking in both the AP and Coaches polls and winning their seventh consecutive ACC title. Bowden had two returning Consensus All-Americans and two other All-Americans
 among his 16 starters along with 19 fifth-year seniors. "This time a year ago, I said we had a talented football team, but it's the least experience we've had in a long time", Bowden said. "Now we've got most of the same guys back. Most of those guys started. That's the reason for so much preseason optimism." As expected, FSU was at the top of the first Coaches Poll of the season, released August 5, 1999 with 36 of a possible 59 first-place votes; other teams receiving first-place votes were No.2 Tennessee with 13 votes, No. 3 Arizona with 2 votes, and No. 4 Penn State with 8 votes. FSU was also atop the AP poll, released August 14, 1999 with 48 of a possible 70 first-place votes; other teams receiving first-place votes were No. 2 Tennessee with 15 votes, No. 3 Penn State with 4 votes, No. 4 Arizona, No. 5 Florida, and No. 13 Virginia Tech with 1 vote each. Seminoles came into pre-season camp with a healthy Chris Weinke who had to miss the 1999 Fiesta Bowl BCS National championship game due to a season-ending cervical herniated disc sustained during a sack against Virginia.

Despite being touted as a top NFL draft pick, Consensus All-American Peter Warrick stated his desire to earn his undergraduate degree and to win a national championship after the Seminoles shared a sad result in the 1999 Fiesta Bowl BCS National Championship game. Warrick would enter the 1999 season as a heisman front runner alongside Drew Brees, Ron Dayne, and Joe Hamilton. On top of being a heisman favorite, Warrick was considered the front-runner for the Fred Biletnikoff award for the nations top wide receiver. The Weinke led offense that scored 31 points a game in 1998 would find himself with a senior talented corp of wide receivers with Warrick, Laveranues Coles, and Ron Dugans.

Recruiting class

Due to FSU having 74 scholarship players on the roster and the maximum per NCAA is 85, FSU was only able to sign 13 players on National Signing Day. Despite only signing 13 players, this stellar recruiting class was highlighted by four highly touted recruits that made USA Today's All-USA high school football team: Nick Maddox (RB), Kendyll Pope (LB), Darnell Dockett (DL), and the top prospect in the country, Anquan Boldin (QB) who selected FSU over Florida and Miami. During preseason football practice, Anquan Boldin would move from QB to WR at his request, a move that would eventually pay big career dividends. The move surprised Bowden who stated ``I told him he'd be a great quarterback, (His decision) surprised all of us. He is an excellent prospect wherever he lines up.''

The recruiting class of 13

Offseason news
On November 12, 1998, Chris Weinke underwent surgery at Tallahassee Memorial Hospital to repair damage to his C6 vertebrae. The surgery repaired ligament damage, corrected a ruptured disc and removed a bone chip which was lodged against a nerve in his neck. There was much uncertainty as to whether or not Weinke would be fully healthy for the 1999 season as there was a 6-month recovery period and much weight loss.

Schedule

Rankings

Season recap

Louisiana Tech

Georgia Tech

N.C. State

North Carolina

Duke

Miami

Wake Forest

Clemson

Virginia

Maryland

Florida

Sugar Bowl vs. Virginia Tech

Coaching staff

Roster

Starting lineup

Offense

Defense

Special teams

Statistics
 QB Chris Weinke: 232/377 (61.5%) for 3,103 yards (8.23) with 25 TD vs. 14 INT (3.71%).
 RB Travis Minor: 180 carries for 815 yards (4.53) with 7 TD. 16 catches for 102 yards and 0 TD.
 WR Peter Warrick: 71 catches for 934 yards (13.15) with 8 TD. 16 carries for 96 yards (6.00) and 3 TD.
 WR Ron Dugans: 43 catches for 644 yards (14.98) with 3 TD.
 WR Marvin Minnis: 19 catches for 257 yards (13.53) with 3 TD.
 WR Laveranues Coles: 12 catches for 179 yards (14.92) with 1 TD.
 WR Anquan Boldin: 12 catches for 115 yards (9.58) with 2 TD. 4 carries for 33 yards (8.25) and 0 TD.
 DB Andrew Howard: 3 INTs (1 TD); 2 PR TDs; 1 Kickoff TD 
 K Sebastian Janikowski: 23 FGM and 47 XPM.
 P Austin Haywood: 1 punt for 73 yards
 First team in history to go wire to wire #1 in all three major polls.

Awards and honors

First Team All-Americans

Individual Award Winners
Lou Groza Award – Sebastian Janikowski, K

References

Florida State
Florida State Seminoles football seasons
BCS National Champions
Atlantic Coast Conference football champion seasons
Sugar Bowl champion seasons
College football undefeated seasons
Florida State Seminoles football